Alpha Gamma Upsilon  was a social fraternity founded in 1922 at Anthony Wayne Institute in Fort Wayne, Indiana. In May 1965, it was absorbed in part by Alpha Sigma Phi (ΑΣΦ).

Founding

Insignia

Colors: Black and Gold
Flower: Pink Rose
Badge: Diamond-shaped shield of black enamel across the center of which is superimposed in gold the Greek letters "Alpha", "Gamma", and "Upsilon". In the area above these letters appear two links; below is a miniature dagger. The standard badge is 3/8" x 5/8" and jeweled badges are optional. Smaller badges may be presented to mothers, wives, sisters and fiancees of fraternity members.
Motto: ΑΔΕΛΦΟΣ ΑΝΔΡΙ ΠΑΡΕΙΗ

Publications

Annual Magazine: The Links - published in May. 
The Forum: Monthly bulletin published to keep information flowing from the chapters to the alumni and to bring briefs of national organization activities - Discontinued 1943 - Restarted 1950 as The Fraternity Forum
The Procedures Manual
The Pledge Manual

Auxiliary
In 1947, a women's auxiliary to Alpha Gamma Upsilon named Alpha Alpha Pi was created and made open to mothers, wives, fiancées, sisters, and daughters of active and alumni brothers.

Chapters
Chapters at time of merger included the following. Those active at the time of dissolution are noted in bold, those inactive in italics:

Merger
Chapter growth had stalled by 1951. Several chapters closed by mid-decade, and by 1962 a healthy Kappa chapter at Defiance College went local, and then sought membership in a larger national.  Under these pressures, the faculty advisor for Alpha Gamma Upsilon's Lycoming College chapter, Dr. Otto Sonder (an alumnus of Alpha Sigma Phi) who was knowledgeable of the discussion of a possible merger, introduced the National Officers of Alpha Gamma Upsilon to  Alpha Sigma Phi's Executive Secretary, Ralph F. Burns.

In 1965, the Alpha Gamma Upsilon chapter at Lycoming was installed as Gamma Rho Chapter of Alpha Sigma Phi. Chapters at Detroit Institute of Technology, Indiana Institute of Technology, and Eastern Michigan University followed suit in 1966. Those four chapters were, under the terms of the merger agreement, considered chartered in Alpha Sigma Phi as of their chartering dates in Alpha Gamma Upsilon, which were 1951, 1930, 1932, and 1948, respectively. The merger was completed when Lawrence Institute of Technology was re-accredited and its 55-year-old Alpha Gamma Upsilon chapter chartered in 1967. Thus Alpha Sigma Phi gained five chapters from the merger.

Unlike Alpha Sigma Phi's mergers with Phi Pi Phi and Alpha Kappa Pi, there was no blanket invitation to Alpha Gamma Upsilon alumni to be initiated into Alpha Sigma Phi, however some of the more prominent leaders of Alpha Gamma Upsilon did so. Alpha Gamma Upsilon's Delta chapter at General Motors Institute did not participate in the merger, but sought and received a charter from Phi Gamma Delta.  Alpha Gamma Upsilon's Lambda chapter at Trine University sought and received a charter from Sigma Phi Epsilon.

References

Defunct fraternities and sororities
Student organizations established in 1922
1922 establishments in Indiana
Alpha Sigma Phi